Jakob Ebert (26 January 1549 – 5 February 1614) was a German theologian and poet.

Life
He was school director in Soldin, Schwiebus and Grünberg. From 1594 he was on the faculty of the university  in Frankfurt (Oder), teaching theology.

Hymns
Ebert was the author of the hymn "Du Friedefürst, Herr Jesu Christ", which appeared in 1601 with a melody by Bartholomäus Gesius. Composers using this hymn included Dietrich Buxtehude (BuxW 20 and 21) and Johann Sebastian Bach, who based a chorale cantata on it, Du Friedefürst, Herr Jesu Christ, BWV 116, and used it in several other cantatas.

Literature
 

16th-century German Protestant theologians
17th-century German Protestant theologians
1549 births
1614 deaths
People from Szprotawa
People from Austrian Silesia
German male non-fiction writers
16th-century German male writers
17th-century German writers
17th-century German male writers